Fuaamotu International Airport  is an international airport in Tonga. It is on the south side of the main island, Tongatapu, 20 km from the capital of Tonga, Nukualofa. Although named after the nearby village of Fuaʻamotu, which is on Tungī's (the king's) estate, in reality the airfield is located on the Tui Pelehake's estate, closer to the village of Pelehake (which did not yet exist as a village during the early aviation days).

The air field was constructed by Seabees of the  1st Construction Battalion with assistance and labor of the U. S. Army 147th Infantry Regiment. It was intended as a World War II heavy bomber field, and had three coral-surfaced runways. In the late 1970s, it was expanded to permit jet aircraft to use the runways. Fuaamotu is now suitable for up to Boeing 767 size aircraft, but remains closed to larger jets (e.g. Boeing 747s).

Fuaamotu International Airport is equipped with VOR/DME (114.5) and NDB (245) navigational facilities. No ILS is available.  Lighting is provided for the runway, apron, and taxiway. International airlines with regular services to Fuaamotu include Air New Zealand and Fiji Airways. Fiji Airways flies Boeing 737-800 aircraft from Nadi and ATR 42-500 aircraft from Suva (operated by Fiji Link). Air New Zealand flies Airbus A320 and Boeing 787 aircraft from Auckland. In March 2016, Air New Zealand announced plans to serve Fuaamotu with a one-off Boeing 787-9s for the Auckland–Tonga route due to demand on June 15, 2016. Virgin Australia flew a Boeing 737-800 from Sydney and Auckland until services were withdrawn in 2020. Under Tongan law, Fuaamotu International Airport is closed on Sundays — only to be opened in distress, after the minister's approval.

Air traffic control
Fuaamotu is a total controlled aerodrome and all traffic are guided by air traffic control.  The tower is contactable on 118.5, and Ground on 121.9. Outside of the hours of service at Fuaamotu a limited FIS is available by Auckland Oceanic.

Runway 11/29: (Elev 91 ft/28m) PCN 45 FBXT  (Flexible pavement, medium subgrade strength, medium tyre pressure, technical evaluation completed). Runway End Identifier Lights are installed at each end of the runway, as are T-VASI glidescope indicators.  Low Intensity Runway Lighting is provided, and a simple Low Intensity Lighting Approach Lighting System is installed on Runway 11.

Size restrictions

It is the strength of the runway rather than the length that restricts operations from Fuaamotu. Even a fully laden Boeing 767-300ER on a flexible pavement B strength, such as at this airport, requires a Pavement Classification Number (PCN) of 59, therefore is not allowed to take off with full load. The same can be said of a Boeing 747-400, which theoretically could take off and land at Fuaamotu length-wise, but needs a PCN of 66, and would therefore damage the runway severely in the process (A B747-400 weighs over twice as much as a B767-300ER).

Access
There is no public bus service to the airport, but several hostels and hotels in Nukualofa meet flights and taxis are available.

Airlines and destinations

See also
 Transportation in Tonga
 List of airports in Tonga

References

External links

 
 Matangi Tonga

Airports in Tonga
Buildings and structures in Nukuʻalofa
Airports established in 1942
Tongatapu
1942 establishments in Tonga
Seabees